Olympiakos or Olympiacos may refer to:
 Olympiacos CFP, a multisport club in Piraeus, Greece
 Olympiacos F.C., the football department of Olympiacos CFP
 Olympiacos B.C., the basketball department of Olympiacos CFP
 Olympiacos S.C., the men's volleyball department of Olympiacos CFP
 Olympiacos Water Polo Club, the men's water polo department of Olympiacos CFP
 Olympiacos Women's Water Polo Team, the women's water polo department of Olympiacos CFP
 Olympiacos women's volleyball, the women's volleyball department of Olympiacos CFP
 Olympiakos Chersonissos F.C., a football club in Chersonisos, Greece
 Olympiakos Neon Liosion, a football club in Ilion, Greece
 Olympiakos Nicosia, a football club in Nicosia, Cyprus
 Olympiakos Patras F.C., a football club in Patras, Greece
 Olympiacos Volou 1937 F.C., a football club in Volos, Greece

See also 
 
 Olympikus, a Brazilian sports manufacturer